Ramnäs is a locality situated in Surahammar Municipality, Västmanland County, Sweden with 1,465 inhabitants in 2010.

In 2014, the area around Ramnas saw the largest forest fire in Sweden in modern times.

References 

Populated places in Västmanland County
Populated places in Surahammar Municipality